Inanga may refer to

 Common galaxias or inanga, a species of freshwater fish
 Dwarf inanga or Galaxias gracilis, a species of freshwater fish
 Inanga (instrument), a type of string instrument in Africa